SK Hydro also known as Suki Kinari HPP, is an under-construction, run-of-the-river hydropower project located on the Kunhar river in the Kaghan valley of Mansehra District Khyber Pakhtunkhwa, which has an installed generation capacity of 874 MW.

The project's deal was finalized in 2014, with the financial closure occurring in January 2017, under the watch of the federal minister of power khawaja asif. The project is sponsored by Chinese state-owned company Gezhouba Group, and is being constructed as part of the China–Pakistan Economic Corridor's "Early Harvest" projects.

As of August 2022, the project reached 90% completion, and is on track for inauguration in December 2022.

Background

The project was first envisaged in 1960, and feasibility studies have been carried out by German GTZ, Quebec based Montreal Engineering and recent detailed design and engineering study was performed by Mott Macdonald of UK.

The Private Power and Infrastructure Board of Pakistan identified a number of sites in the country that were deemed attractive for their hydropower potential. In March 2005, PPIB publicly advertised seven hydropower sites for implementation in the private sector pursuant to the Policy for Power Generation Projects 2002.

SK Hydro Consortium, having the requisite technical and financial strength, submitted its bid for the Suki Kinari Hydropower project. The consortium was prequalified, and a Letter of Interest (LOI) for conducting a feasibility study of the project was issued to SK Hydro on 15 November 2005. The government of the province of Khyber Pakhtunkhwa, Pakistan, announced on August 24, 2016, that it has signed an agreement with SK Hydro Private Ltd. and Industrial and Commercial Bank of China to develop and construct the dam.

Project details
The dam will be constructed as a 54.5 meter high and 336 meter wide concrete gravity dam  with 2 gated spillways. Four 218 MW turbines are to be installed as part of the project, and will generate approximately 870 MW of electricity in total.

Construction of the dam will result in the formation of a 3.1 kilometer long reservoir with a capacity of 9 million cubic meters of water. It will not cause large scale displacement of populations as no villages or towns will be inundated by the resulting dam's reservoir, although a four kilometer section of the Kaghan-Naran highway will have to be diverted as a result of construction works and the resulting reservoir.

Accompanying transmission lines will be constructed by Pakistan's National Transmission and Dispatch Company, and is not considered complementary to the project, but is to be constructed separately from the dam itself.

Expected completion date for the dam is December 2022.

Financing and tariff

The project is being built on a "Build, Own, Operate and Transfer" basis in accordance with Government of Pakistan's Policy for Power Generation Projects 2002. The dam is being developed by Pakistan's SK Hydro group and China's Gezhouba Group. In April 2015, an agreement for 75% of financing costs was signed by the developers and the Exim Bank of China and Industrial and Commercial Bank of China. The project achieved financial close on December 31, 2016.

The projected cost for the project was initially projected to be $1.314 billion, but as a result of devaluation of the Pakistani Rupee, the cost is now estimated to be $1.8 billion.

The Government of Pakistan has agreed to purchase electricity from SK Hydro at a cost of 8.8415 US cents per kilowatt-hour for the 30 years on the cost-plus basis.

References

Hydroelectric power stations in Pakistan
Mansehra District
China–Pakistan Economic Corridor
Dams in Pakistan
Dams under construction
Concrete-face rock-fill dams
Dams in the Indus River basin
2017 establishments in Pakistan